Venskus or Venckus, a common Lithuanian surname, is the shortened Lithuanian translation of the Polish name, Wenceslaus. Wenceslaus II (1271-1305), King of Bohemia, crowned himself King of Poland in 1300. In an attempt to strengthen the power of the Crown, Wenceslaus II undertook a series of initiatives to undermine provincial authority in Lithuania. Such policies threatened the very existence of the  Polish–Lithuanian Commonwealth. The name Venskus has served to strengthen the inherent natural rivalry between Poland and Lithuania, particularly in the Interwar period. The feminine version of this surname would be Venskutė/Venckutė (unmarried), Venckienė/Venskienė (married).

Surnames
Lithuanian-language surnames